Dawukou District (Xiao'erjing: دَاوُکِو ٿِيُوِ) is a district and the seat of the city of Shizuishan in the northwest of the Ningxia Hui Autonomous Region of the People's Republic of China, bordering Inner Mongolia to the north and northwest.

Characteristics

Dawukou District is a well-known industrial region, and it has attracted considerable investment in recent years. The district's main projects vary greatly, and mainly include light polluting or non-polluting industries. The district's postal code is 753000.

Administrative divisions
Dawukou District has 10 subdistricts.
10 subdistricts
 Renmin Road Subdistrict
 Chaoyang
 Changsheng
 Jinlin
 Changxing
 Goukou
 Baijigou
 Shitanjing
 Qingshan
 Changcheng

References

County-level divisions of Ningxia
Shizuishan